As You Like It is a 1912 American silent film based on the play of the same name by William Shakespeare. It was directed by J. Stuart Blackton, Charles Kent, and James Young, and was produced by the Vitagraph Company. The film brings stage star Rose Coghlan to the screen to costar alongside Maurice Costello. At 61 or 62 Coghlan is an older Rosalind than usual.

Cast

Preservation status 
A print of this film survives in 16 mm format.

References

External links 
  As You Like It at IMDb.com

1912 films
American silent short films
Vitagraph Studios films
Films based on As You Like It
Films directed by J. Stuart Blackton
American black-and-white films
American films based on plays
1910s American films